The 27 Club is an informal list consisting mostly of popular musicians, artists, actors, and other celebrities who died at age 27. Although the claim of a "statistical spike" for the death of musicians at that age has been refuted by scientific research, it remains a cultural phenomenon, documenting the deaths of celebrities, many noted for their high-risk lifestyles. Because the club is entirely notional, there is no official membership.

Cultural phenomenon 
Beginning with the deaths of several 27-year-old popular musicians between 1969 and 1971, dying at the age of 27 came to be, and remains, a perennial subject of popular culture, celebrity journalism, and entertainment industry lore. This cultural phenomenon, which came to be known as the "27 Club," attributes special significance to popular musicians, artists, actors, and other celebrities who died at age 27, often as a result of drug and alcohol abuse or violent means such as homicide, suicide, or transportation-related accidents. Several exhibitions have been devoted to the idea, as well as novels, films and stage plays. The cultural phenomenon also gave rise to an urban myth that celebrity deaths are more common at 27, a claim that has been refuted by statistical research.

History 

Brian Jones, Jimi Hendrix, Janis Joplin, and Jim Morrison all died at the age of 27 between 1969 and 1971. Blues musician Robert Johnson, who died in 1938, is one of the earliest popular musicians to be included in lists of 27 Club members.

According to Hendrix and Cobain's biographer Charles R. Cross, the growing importance of the media—Internet, magazines, and television—and the response to an interview of Cobain's mother were jointly responsible for such theories. An excerpt from a statement that Cobain's mother, Wendy Fradenburg Cobain O'Connor, made in the Aberdeen, Washington, newspaper The Daily World—"Now he's gone and joined that stupid club. I told him not to join that stupid club."—referred to Hendrix, Joplin, and Morrison dying at the same age, according to Cross. Other authors share his view. On the other hand, Eric Segalstad, writer of The 27s: The Greatest Myth of Rock & Roll, assumed that Cobain's mother referred to the death of his two uncles and his great-uncle, all of whom had also committed suicide. According to Cross, the events have led a "set of conspiracy theorists [to suggest] the absurd notion that Kurt Cobain intentionally timed his death so he could join the 27 Club".

In 2011, seventeen years after Cobain's death, Amy Winehouse died at the age of 27, prompting a renewed swell of media attention devoted to the club once again. Three years earlier, she had expressed a fear of dying at that age.

An individual does not necessarily have to be a musician to qualify as a "member" of the 27 Club. Rolling Stone included television actor Jonathan Brandis, who committed suicide in 2003, in a list of 27 Club members. Anton Yelchin, who had played in a punk rock band but was primarily known as a film actor, was also described as a member of the club upon his death in 2016. Likewise, Jean-Michel Basquiat has been included in 27 Club lists, despite the relative brevity of his music career, and his prominence as a painter.

Scientific studies 
According to music biographer Charles R. Cross, "The number of musicians who passed away at 27 is truly remarkable by any standard. Though humans die regularly at all ages, there is a statistical spike for musicians who die at 27." 

Despite the cultural significance given to musician and celebrity deaths at age 27, the claim that they are statistically more common at this age is an urban myth, refuted by scientific research.

A study by university academics published in the British Medical Journal in December 2011 concluded that there was no increase in the risk of death for musicians at the age of 27, stating that there were equally small increases at ages 25 and 32. The study noted that young adult musicians have a higher death rate than the general young adult population, surmising that "fame may increase the risk of death among musicians, but this risk is not limited to age 27". The selection criteria for the musicians included in the study, based on having scored a UK No. 1 album between 1956 and 2007, excluded several notable members of the 27 Club, including Hendrix, Joplin, Morrison, Pete Ham, and Ron "Pigpen" McKernan.

A 2014 article at The Conversation suggested that statistical evidence shows popular musicians are most likely to die at the age of 56 (2.2% compared to 1.3% at 27).

In popular culture

Music 
 The name of the song "27" by Fall Out Boy from their 2008 album Folie à Deux is a reference to the club. The lyrics explore the hedonistic lifestyles common in rock and roll. Pete Wentz, the primary lyricist of Fall Out Boy, wrote the song because he felt that he was living a similarly dangerous lifestyle.
 John Craigie's song "28", which appeared on his 2009 album Montana Tale, and 2018 live album Opening for Steinbeck, is written from the perspective of 27 Club members Jim Morrison, Janis Joplin, and Kurt Cobain, as each contemplates their respective mortality and imagines what they would do differently "if I could only make it to twenty eight."  Craigie wrote the song when he himself was age 27.
 The theme is referenced in the song "27 Forever" by Eric Burdon, on his 2013 album 'Til Your River Runs Dry.
 The band Letlive featured a song named "27 Club" on its 2013 album The Blackest Beautiful.
 Magenta's 2013 studio album The Twenty Seven Club directly references the club. Each track is a tribute to a member of the club.
 Daughtry's song "Long Live Rock & Roll" from their 2013 album Baptized references the club with the lyrics "they're forever 27 – Jimmy, Janis, Brian Jones".
 Rapper Watsky references the club on his 2014 song "All You Can Do" with the lyric, "I tried to join the 27 Club; they kicked me out." The song then goes on to reference some famous members of the club, namely Amy Winehouse, Janis Joplin, Jimi Hendrix, Kurt Cobain, Jim Morrison, and Brian Jones.
 Frank Ocean's 2016 song "Nights" features the lyric "No white lighters 'til I fuck my 28th up", referencing the white lighter myth associated with many members of the 27 club. 
 Mac Miller's 2015 song "Brand Name" contains the lyric "To everyone who sell me drugs: Don't mix it with that bullshit; I'm hoping not to join the 27 Club". Miller died aged 26, after consuming counterfeit oxycodone pills that contained fentanyl.
 The song "27 Club" by Ivy Levan, released as a promotional single for her 2015 album No Good, refers to the club.
 JPEGMafia's 2016 album Black Ben Carson includes a song titled "The 27 Club", which the song refers to the infamous club. He explicitly references fallen members Jimi Hendrix, Janis Joplin, and Kurt Cobain.
 The Halsey song "Colors" includes the line "I hope you make it to the day you're 28 years old." The song was written about someone with a serious drug problem, and is widely rumored to be about rock singer Matty Healy of the band The 1975.
 Adore Delano released a song called "27 Club" on her 2017 studio album Whatever, with the repeated lyric "All of the legends die at twenty seven." Delano was aged 27 at the time of release.
 In 2017, the MonaLisa Twins released "Club 27", a song on their album "Orange", about the 27 Club.
 Juice Wrld referenced the club on his 2018 song "Legends", where he says "What's the 27 Club? We ain't making it past 21." The song was dedicated to XXXTentacion, who was killed at 20, and Lil Peep, who died from an overdose at 21. Juice Wrld himself died at the age of 21 from an accidental overdose.
 The Pretty Reckless released a song titled "Rock and Roll Heaven" on its 2021 studio album Death by Rock and Roll. The song is about the club and mentions explicitly in the lyrics Jimi Hendrix, Janis Joplin and Jim Morrison. Frontwoman Taylor Momsen wrote the song after falling into a depressive state from the deaths of her producer Kato Khandwala and Chris Cornell, the latter of whom her band had opened for the night before his death.
 The Blind Channel song "Dark Side", the Finnish entry for the Eurovision Song Contest 2021, includes the lyrics "Like the 27 Club, headshot, we don't wanna grow up".

Video games 
 In the 2016 video game Hitman, one of the in-game missions, Club 27, involves killing an indie musician who is celebrating his 27th birthday.

Comics 
 Cartoonist Luke McGarry created The 27 Club comic series for MAD Magazine, debuting in its relaunch's first issue in 2018. The comics featured Jimi Hendrix, Janis Joplin, Brian Jones, Robert Johnson, Amy Winehouse, Jim Morrison, and Kurt Cobain as paranormal pop stars descending from Rock & Roll Heaven to save the planet with the aid of mortal medium Keith Richards. The series continued in subsequent issues until Potrzebie Comics (the section in which the comic appeared) was retired upon the magazine's 2019 format switch to the reprinting of classic articles for the majority of most new issues.

Identified members 
Because the 27 Club is entirely notional, there is no official membership. The following table lists people described as "members" of the club in reliable published sources, in the opinion of their respective authors.

See also 

 23 enigma
 Apophenia
 Curse of the ninth
 List of deaths in rock and roll
 List of murdered hip hop musicians
 Saturn return
 White lighter myth

Citations

General sources 
  p. 304. p. 306.

1994 introductions
Cultural aspects of death
Death-related lists
Lists of musicians
Numerology